Vaiusu is a village on the Samoan island of Upolu. It is located on the central-north coast of the island, to the west of the capital Apia. As of 2016, Vaiusu had a population of 2,686.

In 2019 the government proposed a US$100 million wharf and port project for Vaiusu, to be funded by a loan from China. Following the 2021 Samoan general election newly elected Prime Minister Fiamē Naomi Mataʻafa formally scrapped the project.

Religion 
The majority of the community adhere to the Catholic Church. There are also members of Islam, with a mosque located along the main road in Vaiusu-Tai and members of Assembly Of God (AOG) in Vaiusu-Uta.

References

Populated places in Tuamasaga